Porricondylinae is a subfamily of gall midges and wood midges in the family Cecidomyiidae.

Genera 
List of genera, after Gagné & Jaschhof (2014):
Tribe Asynaptini
Asycola Spungis 1991
Asynapta Loew 1850
Colomyia Kieffer 1892
Camptomyia Kieffer 1894
Epicola Spungis 1991
Feltomyia Alexander 1936
Larimyia Fedotova & Sidorenko 2007
Lobopedosis Fedotova & Sidorenko 2005
Parasynapta Panelius 1965
Pseudocamptomyia Parnell 1971
Stackelbergiella Marikovskij 1958
Svenartia Jaschhof 2013
Tribe Dicerurini
†Adsumyia Fedotova & Perkovsky 2008 Rovno amber, Ukraine, Eocene
Arctepidosis Mamaev 1990
†Cretadicerura Azar and Nel, 2020, Lebanese amber, Barremian
Desertepidosis Mamaev & Soyunov 1989
Dicerura Kieffer 1898
Dirhiza Loew 1850
Glemparon Jaschhof 2013
Grisepidosis Mamaev 1968
†Libanohilversidia Azar and Nel, 2020, Lebanese amber, Barremian
Hilversidia Mamaev 1966
Neurepidosis Spungis 1987
Paratetraneuromyia Spungis 1987
Recessepidosis Fedotova & Sidorenko 2008
Solntsevia Mamaev 1965
Tetraneuromyia Mamaev 1964
Ubinomyia Mamaev 1990
†Velafacera Fedotova & Perkovsky 2008 Rovno amber, Eocene
Vulnepidosis Fedotova & Sidorenko 2007
Tribe Porricondylini
Ancorepidosis Fedotova & Sidorenko 2008
Anisepidosis Fedotova & Sidorenko 2005
Armatepidosis Fedotova & Sidorenko 2007
Bryocrypta Kieffer 1896
Bulbepidosis Mamaev 1990
Cassidoides Mamaev 1960
Cedrocrypta Kieffer 1919:
Claspettomyia Grover 1964
Coccopsis Meijere 1901:
Cognitepidosis Fedotova & Sidorenko 2005
Cryptodontomyia Jaschhof 2013
Cryptoneurus Mamaev 1964
Dallaiella Mamaev 1997
Dendrepidosis Mamaev 1990
Dentepidosis Mamaev 1990
Divellepidosis Fedotova  &  Sidorenko  2007
Furcepidosis Mamaev 1990
†Gratomyia Fedotova & Perkovsky 2008 Rovno amber, Ukraine, Eocene
Holoneurus Kieffer 1895
Incrementistyla Fedotova & Sidorenko 2007
Isocolpodia Parnell 1971
Jamalepidosis Mamaev 1990
Lamellepidosis Mamaev 1990
Melicepidosis Fedotova & Sidorenko 2007
Monepidosis Mamaev 1966
Neocolpodia Mamaev 1964
Obryzepidosis Fedotova & Sidorenko 2007
Paneliusia Jaschhof 2013
Parepidosis Kieffer 1913
Parvovirga Jaschhof 2013
Paurodyla Jaschhof 2013
Porricondyla Rondani 1840
Pseudepidosis Mamaev 1966
Putepidosis Fedotova & Sidorenko 2007
Pyxicoccopsis Fedotova & Sidorenko 2007
Rostellatyla Jaschhof 2013
Rostratyla Jaschhof 2013
Schistoneurus Mamaev 1964
Sclerepidosis Mamaev 1990
Serratyla Jaschhof 2013
Seychellepidosis Spungis 2007
Spungisomyia Mamaev & Zaitzev 1996
Stomatocolpodia Mamaev 1990
Trichepidosis Mamaev 1990
†Volnococcopsis Fedotova & Perkovsky 2008 Rovno amber, Eocene
Yukawaepidosis Fedotova & Sidorenko 2007
Zaitzeviola Fedotova & Sidorenko 2007
Zatsepinomyia Mamaev & Zaitzev 1997
Zephyrepidosis Fedotova & Sidorenko 2008
Incertae sedis
Clinophaena Kieffer 1913
Harpomyia Felt 1916
†Meunieria Kieffer 1904 Baltic amber, Eocene
Misocosmus Kieffer 1913
Monocolpodia Mamaev 1990
Nebulepidosis Fedotova & Sidorenko 2008
Palaeospaniocera Meunier 1901 African copal, recent
Rabindrodiplosis Grover 1964
Salpistepidosis Fedotova & Sidorenko 2007
Tersepidosis Fedotova & Sidorenko 2007

References 

Cecidomyiidae
Nematocera subfamilies